S. M. Kaiser was a former Indian association football player who played for Calcutta Football League side East Bengal. He was part of the India national squad that competed at the 1948 Summer Olympics in London against France. He captained East Bengal in 1949–50.

Honours
East Bengal
IFA Shield: 1945, 1949

References

External links
 

Year of birth missing
Possibly living people
Indian footballers
East Bengal Club players
Footballers from Kolkata
India international footballers
Olympic footballers of India
Footballers at the 1948 Summer Olympics
Place of birth missing
Association football midfielders
Calcutta Football League players